A list of windmills in the German state of Thuringia

References

Windmills
Thuringia
Windmills